Hwang Ik-hwan (born 19 May 1965) is a South Korean speed skater. He competed in two events at the 1988 Winter Olympics.

References

1965 births
Living people
South Korean male speed skaters
Olympic speed skaters of South Korea
Speed skaters at the 1988 Winter Olympics
Place of birth missing (living people)
Asian Games medalists in speed skating
Speed skaters at the 1986 Asian Winter Games
Medalists at the 1986 Asian Winter Games
Asian Games bronze medalists for South Korea
21st-century South Korean people
20th-century South Korean people